Taeniamia zosterophora, the girdled cardinalfish, is a species of cardinalfish native to the western Pacific Ocean from Indonesia to Vanuatu and from the Ryukyus to Australia. It is in the genus Taeniamia, which was described in 2013. This species can be found on reefs in protected bays and lagoons, occurring in dense schools around and among the branches of various species of branching corals, notably Porites cylindrica and species of Acropora and over sandy patches. It can be distinguished by two narrow vertical red stripes next to its gills and by a distinct small black dot at the base of its tail. It occasionallyis found in  the aquarium trade.

References

External links
 Marinespecies.org
 Sol.org
 

zosterophora
Taxa named by Pieter Bleeker
Fish described in 1856